The Caterham-Lola SP/300.R, or simply SP/300.R, is a track-only, open roof Le Mans Prototype designed by Caterham Cars alongside Lola Cars. The SP/300.R is a limited edition with limited production to 25 per annum.

The car is based on its predecessor, the Lola B08/90 and the Lola B05/40 with performance being based largely on the Caterham Super 7, which, like the SP/300.R, is claimed to be inexpensive to run. Though the car’s aluminium alloy monocoque chassis found in the Lola B08/90 has been credited as the main source of the SP/300.R’s power, it’s turbocharged ECU and gearbox are claimed to power the car for it to sprint to 180 mph in only 2.8 seconds.

History 
The SP/300.R’s design was inspired by the Lola B08/90 Formula 1 race car, with sectioned body panels that can easily be removed in the pits, and a massive front splitter and rear diffuser to help produce downforce.

As with all other current Caterham products, the SP/300.R is powered by a 2.0-liter Ford Duratec engine that is supercharged and tuned by Caterham to produce around 300 hp. It has an automated transmission from Hewland. Caterham has states that the SP/300.R is projected to weigh less than 1320 pounds, which should allow for 0-60 mph of just 2.8 seconds. The car reportedly is capable of 180 mph, according to Caterham.

Racing 
The Caterham-Lola SP/300.R was originally developed for a one-off race championship that started in 2012, which took place in the United Kingdom. It was shipped to Dyson Racing that same year for another Grand Prix event in the U.S. In 2019, the SP/300.R again debuted in the 2019 French Grand Prix.

It is rumored that a road-legal variant of the SP/300.R is under development.

References 

Caterham vehicles
Sports cars